Mohammed Murad Ghaleb (1 April 1922 – 18 December 2007 in Cairo) was an Egyptian politician and diplomat who studied medicine at Cairo University.

Career
Ghaleb supported the revolution of 1952, and between 1955 and 1960 served as vice-minister for foreign affairs. From 1960-1961 he was the ambassador of Egypt to Congo. Between 1961 and 1971 served as ambassador of Egypt to the Soviet Union. In September 1971 was appointed as minister of state for foreign affairs and served as minister of foreign affairs from January to September 1972. In 1973-1974 he served in a diplomatic post in Libya. In 1974–1977 he was the ambassador of Egypt to Yugoslavia. In 1977 he resigned from the ministry of foreign affairs in protest of Anwar Sadat's visit to Israel, and from then onward he dealt with activities for Third World countries. From 1998 until his death he served as president of Afro Asian Peoples' Solidarity Organization, with its headquarters in Cairo.

References

External links
 List of Ministers of Foreign Affairs of Egypt
 1972 news report mentioning Ghaleb
 Obituary at Al-Ahram
 Condolence page in the AAPSO site
 

1922 births
2007 deaths
20th-century diplomats
Foreign ministers of Egypt
Recipients of the Order of the Red Banner of Labour
Ambassadors of Egypt to the Republic of the Congo
Ambassadors of Egypt to the Soviet Union
Ambassadors of Egypt to Yugoslavia
Egyptian expatriates in Libya